Jacopo Furlan (born 22 February 1993) is an Italian professional footballer who plays as a goalkeeper for  club Perugia.

Club career
He made his Serie C debut for Viareggio on 10 February 2013 in a game against Latina.

On 14 November 2018, he signed a one-year deal with Catanzaro.

On 28 June 2019, Furlan signed with Catania.

On 5 October 2020 he returned to his first club Empoli.

On 11 August 2022, Furlan signed a two-year contract with Perugia.

References

External links
 

1993 births
People from San Daniele del Friuli
Living people
Italian footballers
Empoli F.C. players
F.C. Esperia Viareggio players
F.C. Lumezzane V.G.Z. A.S.D. players
S.S. Monopoli 1966 players
Trapani Calcio players
U.S. Catanzaro 1929 players
Catania S.S.D. players
A.C. Perugia Calcio players
Serie B players
Serie C players
Association football goalkeepers
Footballers from Friuli Venezia Giulia